The P. Kesavadev Literary Award is an Indian literary award presented annually by P. Kesavadev Trust to writers in Malayalam literature. The award is named after renowned Malayalam writer P. Kesavadev.

Recipients

References

External links
 

Indian literary awards
Awards established in 2005
Malayalam literary awards
2005 establishments in India